George Barton (born 23 August 1934) is a former  Australian rules footballer who played with Hawthorn in the Victorian Football League (VFL).

Brother of Colin Barton, who played with Geelong Football Club and Bill Barton who played with North Melbourne Football Club.

Notes

External links 

Living people
1934 births
Australian rules footballers from Victoria (Australia)
Hawthorn Football Club players
Myrtleford Football Club players